Solyanka is a thick, spicy, and sour soup in Eastern European cuisine.

Solyanka may also refer to:
Solyanka (river), a river in Perm Krai, Russia
Solyanka (rural locality), several rural localities in Russia